Marlborough Country Club is a private country club open to the public on Mondays and Tuesdays located in Marlborough, Massachusetts, United States. The club formally opened on June 3, 1922. The feature event was a four-ball best-ball match in which Francis Ouimet and his partner Larry Paton defeated Ed Childs and Parker Schofield. Ouimet played a round in 78.

History 
In 1921, the current back nine at Marlborough was designed by Wayne E. Styles. In 1992, three holes at Marlborough Country Club were selected to a list of "The Most Outstanding 18 Holes" in the region by professionals in the area. They selected the 12th, 14th, and 16th holes. Especially the 16th hole because it is the hardest hole on the back nine. The front nine was designed by the team of Geoffrey Cornish and William G. Robinson in 1968.

Marlborough Country Club was host of Senior PGA Tour Event The Marlborough Classic from 1981 to 1983. Bob Goalby won the event in 1981, with Arnold Palmer winning in 1982 and Don January winning in 1983. The event has since changed locations to the Nashawtuc Country Club in Concord, Massachusetts and is now called Bank of America Championship.

The current Marlborough Country Club champion (2020) is Brian Valencia of Marlborough, Massachusetts.

Scorecard

*

References

External links
 Official Website

1922 establishments in Massachusetts
Golf clubs and courses in Massachusetts
Clubs and societies in the United States
Buildings and structures in Marlborough, Massachusetts
Sports venues completed in 1922
Sports in Marlborough, Massachusetts
Sports venues in Middlesex County, Massachusetts